Sound of My Heart is the fifth studio album by the German synthpop band Hubert Kah, and their second English language album, released in 1989. It was produced by Michael Cretu. Three singles were released from the album: "Welcome, Machine Gun", "So Many People" and "It's Me, Cathy (Follow My Heart)". The band's 1987 single "Military Drums" was also included as a track on the Japanese and US editions of Sound of My Heart.

Reception

Upon release, Billboard commented: "Early dance hit "Machine Gun" and current "So Many People" prove to be a somewhat deceptive introduction to a collection that fits more comfortably in a techno/modern rock bag. Although pop radio at large may miss the boat on this one, tracks like "Cathy" and "Carousel" may appeal to the more adventurous programmers". Barry Walters of The San Francisco Examiner noted Kemmler's "soaring, stylish tenor" and Cretu's "lavish, invigorating production" on the album.

Track listing

Chart performance

Album

Singles
Military Drums

Welcome, Machine Gun

So Many People

Cathy

Personnel
Hubert Kah
 Hubert Kemmler - vocals, producer, arrangement
 Markus Löhr - keyboards, guitar, producer, arrangement
 Klaus Hirschburger - bass, producer, arrangement

Additional personnel
 Peter Weihe - guitar
 Curt Cress - additional percussion
 Lothar Krell - additional keyboard on "Victim of Brain"
 Amy Goff - vocals on "Cathy"
 Annette Humpe - vocals on "Carrousel" and "The Voice of Silence"
 Inga Humpe - vocals on "Carrousel" and "The Voice of Silence"
 Michael Cretu - producer, recording, mixer, additional keyboards
 Frank Peterson - assistant engineer
 Mike Schmidt - artwork
 Stefan Langer - photography

References

1989 albums
Intercord albums
Hubert Kah albums